Mohabbat Jan Chowdhury is a former Bangladeshi Army Major General, politician and former Home Minister. He served as the Director General of DGFI.

Early life and family
Mohabbat Jan Chowdhury was born into a Bengali Muslim family who were erstwhile Zamindars of Khanpur in Gopalganj. His father, Said Jan Chowdhury (d. 1984), was a civil servant and the son of Zamindar Rahmat Jan Chowdhury of Khanpur. His great grandfather, Ahmad Jan Chowdhury was one of the two sons of Azim Chowdhury, the Zamindar of Dulai in Sujanagar, Pabna District. Through him, he was a descendant of Sharfuddin Sarkar, a nobleman who migrated to Dulai from Samarkand in Turkestan. Mohabbat's mother belonged to the aristocratic zamindar family of Ulania, who traced their ancestry to Persia.

Career
Chowdhury trained at the Pakistan Military Academy and joined the Pakistan Army in September 1955 as a second lieutenant. He was a batch mate of Ziaur Rahman. He served in a number of positions including in staff headquarters, Military Training Schools, and worked Inter-Services Intelligence. During the Bangladesh Liberation War he was based in Pakistan and was repatriated to Bangladesh after the end of the war. After the Independence of Bangladesh he joined Bangladesh Army. He was deputed to Bangladesh Rifles where he served as the deputy director general. He was the director of Army signal corps and then the Director General of Directorate General of Forces Intelligence in 1977. He said the results of referendum of President Ziaur Rahman, which he won 98.88 percent of the votes, was inflated by the administration which he described as unnecessary. He was the Director General in 1981 during the Assassination of President Ziaur Rahman. After the assassination, Chwodhury and National Security intelligence Director General ASM Hakim. Both supported Shah Aziz and Hossain Mohammad Ershad efforts to seize power. He kept Major General Moinul Hossain Chowdhury, head of the investigation into the assassination, under surveillance.

Chowdhury served as the chairman of Bangladesh Krishi Bank and Public Administration Training Centre.

Chowdhury after retirement joined politics. He was elected to parliament from Faridpur-3 from the Bangladesh Krishak Sramik Awami League in 1986. He was the Minister for Home Affairs, Minister of Relief and Rehabilitation, Minister of Establishment and the Ministry of Food in the cabinet of President Hussain Mohmmad Ershad. He is the chairman of two businesses, Dynamic Communications and Taurus Knitwear. He is the director of Micro Industries Development Assistance and Services (MIDAS).

References

Living people
Bangladesh Army generals
Food ministers of Bangladesh
Home Affairs ministers of Bangladesh
Disaster Management and Relief ministers of Bangladesh
Public Administration ministers of Bangladesh
3rd Jatiya Sangsad members
Year of birth missing (living people)
Bangladeshi people of Turkic descent
Bangladeshi people of Iranian descent
People from Gopalganj District, Bangladesh